The Reynella Football Club is an Australian rules football club first formed on 18 April 1896.  Reynella first joined an organised competition in 1914, the Mid-Southern Football Association, playing in that competition until the end of 1918.  In 1919, Reynella joined the Southern Football Association for the first time, but only lasted one season before returning to the Mid-Southern Association.

In 1928, Reynella merged with the Morphett Vale Football Club and joined the Southern Football Association.  This combination split at the end of the 1929 season and Reynella returned to the Mid-Southern Association.

Reynella remained in the Mid-Southern Association, later the Glenelg District Football Association, until the end of the 1947 season.  Reynella joined the Southern Football Association in 1948 where they have remained ever since.  The Reynella FC continues to field teams in Senior and Junior grades in the Southern Football League. In 2018 Reynella introduced its first female teams in the inaugural SFL female competition.

Reynella FC has produced a number of Australian Football League (AFL/VFL) players including Michael Doughty (Adelaide), Ben Moore (Richmond), Darren Kappler (Fitzroy, Hawthorn, Sydney),  Andrew Brockhurst (Fitzroy), Brenton Harris (North Melbourne),  Darren Harris (North Melbourne), Matthew Golding (Adelaide), Justin Bollenhagen (Fremantle), Cory Gregson (Geelong) and Sam Draper (Essendon) .

A-Grade Premierships
 1936 Glenelg District Football Association B-Grade
 1969 Southern Football League A-Grade
 1975 Southern Football League A-Grade
 1977 Southern Football League A-Grade
 2010 Southern Football League A-Grade
 2013 Southern Football League A-Grade
 2015 Southern Football League A-Grade
 2022 Southern Football League A-Grade

References

External links

 

 
 

Southern Football League (SA) Clubs
Australian rules football clubs in South Australia
1896 establishments in Australia
Australian rules football clubs established in 1896